Fountains Creek, also known as Fontaine Creek, is a tributary of the Meherrin River in the U.S. state of Virginia.

See also
List of rivers of Virginia

References

USGS Hydrologic Unit Map - State of Virginia (1974)

Rivers of Virginia
Tributaries of Albemarle Sound